is a Japanese tarento, comedian and actor.

Takeyama performed boke in the comedy duo Cunning and is known for his often "angry" persona while at the same time being an "easy to tease" character.

Takeyama is also known for his fandom of American football, National Football League and the Green Bay Packers.

Filmography

Current appearances
 Regular

 Quasi-regular

Former appearances

Variety programmes
 Former regular programmes

 Former quasi-regular programmes

 Irregular appearances

Special programmes

TV dramas

Films

Radio
He made his radio debut in KBS Radio when he was part of Tābō Kenbō.

Advertisements, publicity

Works

DVD

CD

Internet

Bibliography

References

External links
 (Sun Music Get) 
 
 

Japanese comedians
Japanese television personalities
Japanese male actors
Japanese television presenters
Japanese radio personalities
People from Fukuoka
1971 births
Living people